The following is a list of wineries in the state of Kansas. Kansas wine refers to wine made from grapes grown in the U.S. state of Kansas.  In the nineteenth century Kansas was a significant grape-growing state. Its latitude, long, sunny growing season and soils ranging from limestone-laced to sandy, can provide favorable conditions for growing grapes if the suitable varieties are planted.

Table

Former wineries
The following is a list of wineries that have closed; this list is for tracking former locations.

See also

 Kansas wine
 List of breweries in Kansas

References

Citations

Works cited

Further reading
 

Agriculture in Kansas
Kansas-related lists
Kansas
Kansas
Wineries in Kansas